Brit, Brits or BRIT may refer to:

People

Nicknames 
 British people, people of Great Britain and Northern Ireland, its Overseas Territories and the Crown Dependencies, and their descendants
 Brit Hume (born 1943), American TV journalist
 Brit Selby (born 1945), Canadian ice-hockey player
 Brit Smith (born 1985), American actress, model, singer, and songwriter
 Britney Spears (born 1981), American singer

Given names 
 Brit Andresen, Norwegian-born Australian architect
 Brit Bildøen (born 1962), Norwegian poet, novelist, essayist, children's writer and literary critic
 Brit Hoel (born 1942), Norwegian politician
 Brit Marling (born 1982), American writer, producer, director and actress
 Brit McRoberts (born 1957), Canadian retired middle-distance runner
 Brit Morgan (born 1987), American film and television actress
 Brit Pettersen (born 1961), Norwegian former cross-country skier
 Brit Sandaune (born 1972), Norwegian soccer player and pre-school teacher
 Brit Solli (born 1959), Norwegian archaeologist
 Brit Volden (born 1960), Norwegian orienteering competitor

Family names 
 Cri-Zelda Brits (born 1983), South African cricketer
 Danie Brits, South African former professional wrestler
 Gorka Brit (born 1978), Spanish footballer
 Grant Brits (born 1987), Australian freestyle swimmer
 Okkert Brits (born 1973), South African former pole vaulter
 Schalk Brits (born 1981), South African rugby union footballer
 Tazmin Brits (born 1991), South African cricketer and former javelin thrower
 Walter Brit (fl. 1390), a fellow of Merton College, Oxford, and the reputed author of works on astronomy and mathematics, as well as a treatise on surgery

Places 
 Brits, North West, a town in the North West province of South Africa, near Pretoria
 River Brit, a river in Dorset, England
 Britstown, a small farming town in the Northern Cape of South Africa

Organizations 
 Botanical Research Institute of Texas, a global botanical research institute and learning center in the U.S.
 Board of Radiation and Isotope Technology, a unit of the Department of Atomic Energy[1] with its headquarters in Navi Mumbai, India
 Brit + Co., an online DIY community/e-commerce company based in San Francisco
 Brit plc, an international general insurance and reinsurance group acquired by Fairfax Financial in May 2015
 BRIT School for Performing Arts and Technology, a British performing arts and technology school in the London Borough of Croydon

Other uses 
The Brit Awards, the British Phonographic Industry's annual pop music awards
Bedford Road Invitational Tournament, a basketball tournament held in Saskatoon, Saskatchewan, Canada
Brit milah, the circumcision of a Jewish baby boy on the eighth day of life
Brit (character), an Image Comics superhero and series
 Brit Stevenson, a character in the film Saw V portrayed by Julie Benz

See also
Britney (disambiguation)
Britt (disambiguation)
Briton (disambiguation)
British (disambiguation)